Zhongzhi Capital (abbreviated as ZZ Capital)  was founded in 2011 with registered capital of RMB 1bn, it is an asset management company which is headquartered in Beijing. It is registered with the Asset Management Association of China.

History
It focuses on media and entertainment, internet and related services, manufacturing, healthcare, financial services, information technology and logistics.

ZZ Capital owned a Hong Kong listed platform - ZZ Capital International. ZZ Capital International has yet to do a single transaction in international markets.
 
ZZ Capital International is listed in Hong Kong Stock Exchange, and licenses for futures trading and asset management. September 7, 2016, ZZ Capital International had officially changed its name from "Asian Capital" to "ZZ Capital International", with its Hong Kong Stock Exchange stock code (08295) unchanged. ZZ Capital will start its own asset management business, and assist ZZ Capital International to establish a sustainable business ecosystem. ZZ Capital ended  with  a  total  comprehensive  loss  of  HK$27.54  million in  the Third  Quarter Fiscal 2016.

In May 2016, Michael Cho joined as an executive director and CEO of ZZ Capital International. Cho will be paid a basic salary of US$1.8 million per year along with other benefits including a housing allowance of HK$130,000 ($16,755) a month, as well as participation in bonus and stock incentive schemes.

In April 2017, Mr. Chen Jianfeng Peter an executive director and Chief Financial Officer of ZZ Capital International was appointed as alternate director to Ms. Duan Di, the Chairman and an executive director of ZZ Capital International.

According to China Venture Capital & Private Equity Annual Ranking 2015, it is the 18th largest domestic private equity firm.

Zhongzhi Capital is currently being investigated by the China Securities Regulatory Commission (CSRC) for multiple offences, and violations raised by the CSRC against Zhongzhi Capital Include:

- No risk assessment was performed on Zhongzhi's private funds that were established after 21 August 2014, specifically; they do not meet the "Interim Measures for supervision and management of private investment funds" provisions of Article XVII;

- Zhongzhi's legal representative Duan Di, senior management personnel Zhang Yun and Qiu Xiaoyun, have not received the qualifications necessary to manage funds, specifically, their practice qualification does not meet the "Securities Investment Fund Law" provisions of Article IX.

According to the public announcement information of private-equity managers on the official website of Asset Management Association of China indicates that Zhongzhi Capital's legal representative Duan Di, senior management personnel Zhang Yun have received the qualifications necessary to manage funds, and Qiu Xiaoyun no longer serves as senior management personnel of Zhongzhi Capital.

In May 2019, Hong Kong's Securities and Futures Commission (SFC) completed an investigation into the shareholding of ZZ Capital International. It found that only 20 shareholders held 91.53 per cent of shares, and issued a warning to potential investors to exercise "extreme caution" due to the high concentration of shareholding. Another such warning was issued by SFC in December 2019, stating that 20 shareholders held 91.22 per cent of shares at that time.

Ownership
Zhongzhi Capital is owned by Zhonghai Shengrong (Beijing) Capital Management Limited Company and as Beijing Zhonghai Jurong Investment Management Limited Company as to 95% and 5% respectively. The ultimate parent company of Zhong Hai Sheng Rong is Zhonghai Sheng Feng (Beijing) Capital Management Limited Company.  The ultimate beneficiary of Zhonghai Shengrong (Beijing) Capital Management Limited Company is Xie Zhikun, founder of Zhongzhi Enterprise Group.

Transactions
ZZ Capital is a strategic shareholder of ZhongNan (002445 A-Share listed), transforming it from an industrial product manufacturer to a large media & entertainment platform company. The market capitalization of ZhongNan before acquisition was RMB2.4bn.
In December 2014, Sanju (300072 A-Share listed) announced its private placement plan. ZZ Capital invested RMB400m and became the 5th largest shareholder, with 2.91% shareholding in the company. The market capitalization of Sanju was RMB17.9bn before the announcement of ZZ Capital's investment.
In September 2015, Zhongzhi Capital and China Profit Investments Limited sold Huazhong Financing and Leasing Co Ltd to Jiangsu Fasten Co Ltd (a related subsidiary and subsequently a related party transaction of ZZ Capital) for US$332 million

References

Private equity firms of China
Chinese companies established in 2011